Kelechi Okoye-Ahaneku (born 28 May 1984)  is a Nigerian football player, who last played for Rangdajied United in the I-League 2nd Division in India.

International career
He was the Captain of the Nigeria national under-20 football team in 2004 and represented the Super Eagles.

Notes

1984 births
Living people
Nigerian footballers
Gombe United F.C. players
Expatriate footballers in India
Heartland F.C. players
Nigerian expatriate sportspeople in India
Lobi Stars F.C. players
Association football midfielders
Nigeria international footballers
I-League players
JUTH F.C. players
Sportspeople from Jos